Mark Kerins (born 1979) is an Irish hurler who played as a centre-forward for the Galway senior team.

Born in Clarinbridge, County Galway, Kerins first arrived on the inter-county scene at the age of eighteen when he first linked up with the Galway minor team, before later joining the under-21 side. He joined the senior team for the 1999 championship. Kerins went on to play a bit part for Galway at various times for almost a decade, and won one National Hurling League medal. He was an All-Ireland runner-up on one occasion.

As a member of the Connacht inter-provincial team at various times, Kerins won two Railway Cup medals. At club level he is a one-time All-Ireland medallist with Clarinbridge. In addition to this he also won one Connacht medal and two championship medals.

His retirement came following the conclusion of the 2008 championship.

Kerins's brother, Alan, enjoyed a lengthy career as a dual player with Galway.

Honours

Team

Clarinbridge
All-Ireland Senior Club Hurling Championship (1): 2011
Connacht Senior Club Hurling Championship (2): 2001
Galway Senior Club Hurling Championship (2): 2001, 2010

Galway
National Hurling League (1): 2000

Connacht
Railway Cup (2): 1999, 2004

References

1979 births
Living people
Clarinbridge hurlers
Galway inter-county hurlers
Connacht inter-provincial hurlers